Margaret B. Hoberg Turrell (1890 – 1948) was an American composer, organist, and philanthropist who with her husband Herbert Turrell founded the Turrell Fund in 1935 to aid at-risk children. She published her music under the name Margaret Hoberg.

Hoberg was born in Terre Haute, Indiana, where she began performing publicly on the piano when she was 12 years old. She later studied music for one year in Berlin, two years in Paris, and in New York City, where she gave concerts of her own compositions and worked as an organist.

In 1916, Hoberg received a fellowship to study at MacDowell. Her Harp Concerto premiered at Carnegie Hall in 1919. She married Herbert Turrell in 1922, a year after his first wife died. In 1935, the couple established the Turrell Fund to aid at-risk children. The Fund donated a total of $238,621,996 between 1935 and 2018, and remains active today.

Hoberg's music was published by M. Witmark & Sons, Oliver Ditson Co. and Arthur P. Schmidt Co. Her compositions include:

Chamber 

Allegro Maestoso (harp, violin and organ)
Calm (harp, violin and organ)
Country Dance (harp)
Log Cabin Sketches (alternate title: Two Suites for Harp)

Orchestra 

Harp Concerto (also arranged for harp and organ)

Vocal 

"Hiawatha's Vision" (baritone and piano)
Little Orphant Annie (choir; text by James Whitcomb Riley)
Maid of the Mist (women's choir; text by Colgate Baker)
"Such a Starved Bank of Moss" (text by Robert Browning)
"When We Two Parted"

External links 

Download free sheet music by Margaret Hoberg
Turrell Fund Website

References 

1890 births
1948 deaths
American philanthropists
MacDowell Colony fellows
American women composers